Vladimir Zakharov (born 1960) is a Russian mathematician, Professor, Dr.Sc., a professor at the Faculty of Computer Science at the Moscow State University.

He defended the thesis «The problem of program equivalence: models, algorithms, complexity» for the degree of Doctor of Physical and Mathematical Sciences (2012).

Author of 2 books and more than 70 scientific articles.

References

Bibliography

External links
 Annals of the Moscow University
 MSU CMC
 Scientific works of Vladimir Zakharov
 Scientific works of Vladimir Zakharov

Russian computer scientists
Russian mathematicians
Living people
Academic staff of Moscow State University
1960 births
Scientists from Kharkiv
Moscow State University alumni